Lorraine Melva Eiler (née MacGuire; born 9 December 1934) was a former Australian women's basketball player.

Biography

In 1957, at the World Championship for Women held in Brazil, Eiler was captain of the first national team to represent Australia at a World basketball Championship. A talented athlete known for her inspirational leadership, smart play and natural athleticism, Eiler was rewarded after the tournament by being the first ever Australian woman to gain a scholarship to an American University. Eiler was also an A grade tennis player, played squash for South Australia, and represented Australia in netball.

Eiler was inducted into the Australian Basketball Hall of Fame in 2007.

References

Australian women's basketball players
Basketball players from South Australia
Living people
1934 births